Master Chef may refer to:

 Chef de cuisine, an occupational title of the main chef in a restaurant
 MasterChef, a competitive cooking television show
 Master Chef, a brand of crepe pastry produced by the Singaporean company Tee Yih Jia

See also
 Master Chief (disambiguation)